John Barkham (1908April 15, 1998) was a South African-born American syndicated writer (book reviewer) for Time, New York Times Book Review, New York World-Telegram, and New York Post who published several thousand book reviewers in over half a century of work (as many as five per week).

Background
Barkham was born in South Africa and spent his childhood on an ostrich farm in Cape Province, South Africa.

Career
About 1939, Time hired him as a stringer. He then became Cairo bureau chief. Around August 1944, when Whittaker Chambers became Foreign News editor at Time, the magazine brought him to New York. Chambers considered Barkham (and Marjorie Smith, researcher) his right and left hands in Foreign News.

In 1950, he became a book reviewer at the Saturday Review.

By 1951, he was an editor at Coronet magazine.

Over the next three decades, he wrote reviews for the New York Times Book Review, New York World-Telegram, and New York Post.  He also interviewed authors.

"He concentrated on contemporary history and books about Africa, particularly about his native South Africa," The New York Times noted at time of death.

He served for 20 years as a Pulitzer Prize juror (fiction, nonfiction, biography).

He served as governor of the Overseas Press Club.

At time of death, he was a trustee of the Carnegie Fund for Authors.

Personal and death
Barkham married Margot Buirski; they had a son, Graham and a daughter, Jennifer.

Whittaker Chambers praised his "unfailing loyalty, patience, evenness of temper, kindness" and "courage.. (which) sometime gave me about all the courage I had to go on."

He died age 90 on April 15, 1998, at a nursing home in Sarasota, Florida, US.

References

1998 deaths
20th-century South African male writers
Time (magazine) people
20th-century American non-fiction writers
20th-century American male writers
1908 births
American male non-fiction writers
South African emigrants to the United States